Lachnocnema overlaeti is a butterfly in the family Lycaenidae. It is found in the Democratic Republic of the Congo.

References

Butterflies described in 1996
Taxa named by Michel Libert
Miletinae
Endemic fauna of the Democratic Republic of the Congo